The 1995 Tournament of the Americas, later known as the FIBA Americas Championship and the FIBA AmeriCup, was a basketball championship hosted by Argentina, from August 15 to August 27, 1995.  The games were played in Tucuman and Neuquen.  This FIBA AmeriCup was to earn the three berths allocated to the Americas for the 1996 Summer Olympics, in Atlanta.  The United States did not participate in the tournament, as the team claimed the host berth in the Olympics.  Puerto Rico defeated Argentina in the final, to win the tournament.  Brazil beat Canada in the third place game, to claim the final Olympic berth.

Qualification
Eight teams qualified during the qualification tournaments held in their respective zones in 1995; Canada qualified automatically since they are one of the two members of the North America zone.
North America: 
Caribbean and Central America:, 

The draw split the tournament into two groups:
 
Group A

 
Group B

Format
The top four teams from each group advance to the quarterfinals.
Results and standings among teams within the same group are carried over.
The top four teams at the quarterfinals advanced to the semifinals. 
The winners in the knockout semifinals advanced to the Final and were granted berths in the 1996 Summer Olympics tournament in Atlanta. The losers figure in a third-place playoff where the winner was given the third and final place in the Olympics.

Squads

Preliminary round

Group A

|}

Group B

|}

Quarterfinal group

The top four teams in both Group A and Group B advanced to the quarterfinal group. Then each team played the four from the other group once to complete a full round robin with the top four advancing to the semifinals.  Records from the preliminary groups carried over.

|}

Knockout stage

Semifinals

Third place game

Final

Awards

Final standings

References
1995 FIBA Americas Championship for Men, FIBA.com.

FIBA AmeriCup
1995 in Argentine sport
International basketball competitions hosted by Argentina
1995–96 in North American basketball
1995–96 in South American basketball